The Elgin may refer to:

 Elgin, Ladbroke Grove
 The Elgin, Darjeeling

See also
 Elgin (disambiguation)
 The Elgins (disambiguation)